La Tortuga Island ("La Tortuga" means "the turtle") is an uninhabited island of Venezuela, the largest in the Federal Dependencies of Venezuela. It is part of a group of islands that include the Tortuguillos and Cayo Herradura.

History
The island was visited by Amerindians from the coast of present-day Venezuela to exploit its natural resources including salt, fish and turtles, well before Spanish colonization of the New World. It is not known by which European explorer the island was first seen and named, yet the name derives from the large numbers of marine turtles that come to lay eggs on its long sandy beaches every year.

The island was seasonally visited by the Dutch who came there to exploit the salt evaporation ponds on the east of the island between 1624 and 1638. They constructed a fort on the island to guard their salt works and repel the Spanish who were eager to keep the Dutch off the island. They were definitively expelled in 1638 when the Spanish governor of Cumaná, Benito Arias Montano, and his forces destroyed their facilities and flooded the salt pans.

Since then, with the exception of fishermen who visit the island seasonally, the island has remained unpopulated and largely untouched. There is some tourism on the island.

Gallery

See also
Federal Dependencies of Venezuela
List of marine molluscs of Venezuela
List of Poriferans of Venezuela
Cariaco Basin

References

External links
Official website
La Tortuga Foundation

Uninhabited islands of Venezuela
Federal Dependencies of Venezuela
Venezuelan islands of the Leeward Antilles